Kayshon Boutte (born May 7, 2002) is an American football wide receiver for the LSU Tigers.

Early years
Boutte attended Westgate High School in New Iberia, Louisiana. As a senior, he had 47 receptions for 1,005 yards with 15 touchdowns and rushed for 874 yards on 71 carries and 12 touchdowns. Boutte played in the 2020 Under Armour All-American Game. Coming out of high school, Boutte was a 5 star recruit and was ranked the nation's #2 wide receiver. He committed to Louisiana State University (LSU) to play college football.

College career
With Ja'Marr Chase opting out of the season to prepare for the 2021 NFL Draft, Boutte entered his true freshman season in 2020 as one of LSU's top receivers. He became the number one receiver after Terrace Marshall Jr. also opted out.

In the 2020 game against Ole Miss, he set a SEC records for receiving yards in a game with 14 receptions for 308 yards, adding three receiving touchdowns as well.

References

External links
LSU Tigers bio

Living people
People from New Iberia, Louisiana
Players of American football from Louisiana
American football wide receivers
LSU Tigers football players
2002 births